Aleksandra Marianna Wiesiołowska (died on 14 August 1645) was the daughter of magnate Marek Sobieski and Jadwiga Snopkowska.

She was married to Court Marshal of Lithuania Krzysztof Wiesiołowski.

Bibliography
 Borkowska M. OSB, Leksykon zakonnic polskich epoki przedrozbiorowej. Tom III. Polska Centralna i Południowa, Wydawnictwo DiG, Warszawa 2008, s. 30.
 Kamieniecka E., Z zagadnień sztuki Grodna połowy XVII wieku, (w:) Lorentz S., Michałowski K., Rocznik Muzeum Narodowego w Warszawie, t. XVI, Warszawa 1972, ss. 87–134.
 Podhorodecki L., Sobiescy herbu Janina, Ludowa Spółdzielnia Wydawnicza, Warszawa 1981, s. 9.

1645 deaths
17th-century Polish nobility
17th-century Polish Roman Catholic nuns
Aleksandra
Aleksandra
Year of birth missing